Welcome to the Dollhouse is the second studio album by American girl group Danity Kane. It was released by Bad Boy Records and Atlantic Records on March 18, 2008 in the US and March 25, 2008 in Canada. Danity Kane recorded the album in under five weeks, while filming the second season of Making the Band 4 with fellow label mates Day26 and Donnie Klang first in New York City, New York, then in Miami, Florida. As with their self-titled debut album, Bad Boy consulted a wide range of producers to work with the band on the album, including The Stereotypes, The Runners and Flex & Hated as well as previous collaborators such as Bryan Michael Cox, Danja, and inhouse producer Mario Winans.

The album earned a largely mixed reception by music critics, many of whom were divided on the question whether Welcome to the Dollhouse was superior to 2006's Danity Kane. It became the band's second consecutive album to debut atop the US Billboard 200, with first weeks sales of 236,000 copies. Spawning the US top ten single "Damaged," the album was eventually certified Gold by Recording Industry Association of America (RIAA). The group intended to open for Janet Jackson's Rock Witchu Tour for promotion, but label conflicts forced them to withdraw. Welcome to the Dollhouse was Danity Kane's last album released before the group broke up in early 2009, and it was also their final album to be released as a quintet.

Production
For this album, all of the girls had written and/or produced some kind of song, that they thought was suitable for their second effort. As mentioned in interviews, Danity Kane has stated that they came up with the name of the album when they all had brought in their own material into the studio to see which tracks would make the cut. They also expressed, that it felt as if they were in a music box, hence getting the name, Welcome to the Dollhouse. Each of the girls, also, were given chances to co-write a handful of the tracks that are on the record.

Singles
The album's lead single, "Damaged," was chosen through an online fan poll., In January 2008, Danity Kane had posted a bulletin on their respective MySpace page, expressing that they were giving their fans the chance to choose their newest single. Fans were given two choices, "Damaged" and "Pretty Boy". Of the two choices, "Damaged" dominated the poll by a vast majority, and thus, became the lead single from Welcome to the Dollhouse. The song debuted on the US Billboard Hot 100 at number 64, and eventually peaked at number 10, becoming their second and final top ten in the United States. Elsewhere, it reached top thirty of the Canadian Hot 100, peaking at number 26, and the top twenty of Billboards Global Dance Songs, becoming Danity Kane's highest-charting international single.

Erik White directed and Gil Duldulao choreographed the music video for "Bad Girl." The video featured cameos from Missy Elliott, Qwanell Mosley from their fellow Bad Boy Records band Day26, and Talan Torriero of the MTV show Laguna Beach. The concept of the video is a graphic novel and stays true to the line in the song "When the red light comes on, I transform" as each member transforms into an alter ego of theirs after a flash of red light. "Bad Girl" marked Danity Kane's last single as a group before their early 2009 breakup, and the band's last single to be released with now-former members D. Woods and Aundrea Fimbres. It peaked at number 85 on the US Billboard Pop 100.

Critical reception

Welcome to the Dollhouse received mixed or average reviews from critics. At Metacritic, which assigns a normalized rating out of 100 to reviews from mainstream critics, the album has an average score of 59 based on 8 reviews. The Village Voice editor Clover Hope wrote that "these gals are older, more cohesive, and more enchanting than before". She found that while the "made-for-Idol ballads "Poetry" and "Is Anybody Listening" impress, Danity's better at cock-teasing over mid-tempo-to-jumpy rhythms. Curiously strong, theirs is more Altoids than bubble-gum pop." Sal Cinquemani from Slant Magazine called the album "a solid collection of appropriately vacant party jams, slinky come-ons, and modern, urban balladry." In another positive review, Vibe remarked that "while DK's quest for pop domination falls short, the club-friendly Dollhouse cements their posh appeal." Billboards Mariel Concepcion remarked that "unlikely the quintet's self-titled debut, which took a slightly more hip-hop soul approach, Welcome to the Dollhouse features more mid- and uptempo pop tracks."

Entertainment Weekly journalist Simon Vozick-Levinson felt that with Welcome to the Dollhouse "the group continues to show us precious little in the way of actual personality or soul. On one song after another, they sing about sex with all the feeling of fresh-from-the-factory mannequins." AllMusic editor Stephen Thomas Erlewine called the album "a paler, plainer recycling of their debut. All five of the DK girls are blandly, conventionally pretty in their voices (not to mention their looks), and no amount of melisma can lend them personality [...] Maybe hearing the end results would be interesting if you've witnessed the labors on Making the Band, but anybody else will wonder why it takes so much work to sound so bland... and why we are bothering thinking about them anyway." The Boston Globe wrote that "unlike their modestly appealing and tuneful debut, this disc [...] is generic and vapid, seemingly geared more for the strip mall than the strip club."

Commercial performance
Welcome to the Dollhouse debuted on top of the US Billboard 200, with first week sales of 236,000 copies, making it the band's second consecutive number-one album. This made Danity Kane the first female group in Billboard history to have both their debut and second albums enter the main charts at the top of the chart. Less than a month after its release, Welcome to the Dollhouse was certified gold by the Recording Industry Association of America (RIAA). By August 2008, the album had sold over 525,000 copies in the US, according to Nielsen SoundScan. Billboard ranked Welcome to the Dollhouse at number 75 on its Billboard 200 year-end listing.

Track listing

Notes
 denotes vocal producer
 denotes co-producer
 denotes additional vocal producer
 denotes additional producer

Personnel
According to the album's booklet and the BMI Repertoire.

Sean Combs – executive producer
Harve Pierre – co-executive producer
Conrad Dimanche - associate executive producer, A&R
Shannon Lawrence - A&R
Daniel Mitchell - A&R coordinator
Hughes Felizor - A&R coordinator
Gwendolyn Niles - A&R administration
Sharon Tucker - A&R administration
Francesca Spero - Bad Boy Films/Making the Band 4 executive
Eric Wong - marketing
Kamala Salmon - marketing
Mark Obriski - art direction and design
Rod Gold - art manager
Carolyn Tracey - packaging production
Rodger Erickson - photographer
Marni Senofonte - styling
Julius Erving - management
Kenneth Meiselas - legal representation
Ed Shapiro - legal representation
Brian Gardner - mastering 
Akeem Lee - producer ("Lights Out")
Antwan Thompson - producer ("Welcome to the Dollhouse")
Bernard Malik Doss - producer ("Ain't Going")
Bryan-Michael Cox - producer ("Sucka For Love" and "2 of You")
Danja - producer ("Bad Girl", "Pretty Boy" and "Strip Tease")
Flex & Hated - producer ("Lights Out")
Fridolin - producer ("Is Anybody Listening")
Harve Pierre - producer ("Welcome to the Dollhouse")
Mario Winans - producer ("Damaged", "Secret Place (Interlude)", "Lights Out", "Picture This (Interlude)", "Poetry" and "Is Anybody Listening")
Rockwilder - producer ("Make Me Sick")
Romeo IX - producer ("Flashback Interlude")
Scyience - producer ("Key to My Heart")
Sean Combs - producer ("Damaged", "Lights Out" and "Is Anybody Listening")
Stereotypes - producer ("Damaged")
The Clutch - producer ("Sucka for Love")
The Runners - producer ("Ecstasy")
Wyldcard - producer ("Sucka for Love" and "2 of You")
Victor Abijaudi - engineer
Steve Dickey - engineer
Paul J. Falcone - engineer
Andy Geel - engineer
Koil - engineer
Bernard Malik - engineer
Matthew Testa - engineer
Sam Thomas - engineer
Jeff Villanueva - engineer
Kevin Wilson - engineer
Marcella Araica - mixing engineer
Giz - mixing engineer
Ken Lewis - mixing engineer
Bernard Malik - mixing engineer
Fabian Marasciullo - mixing engineer
Matthew Testa - mixing engineer
Sam Thomas - mixing engineer
Adonis - vocal producer
Voyce Alexander - vocal producer
Jim Beanz - vocal producer
Mary Brown - vocal producer
Shannon Lawrence - vocal producer
Harve Pierre - vocal producer
Tiff Starr - vocal producer
Mary Brown - backing vocals on "Bad Girl"
Bryan-Michael Cox - arranger, bass guitar, drums, keyboards, programming, strings ("Sucka for Love" and "2 of You")*
Steve Dickey - mixing assistant
Daniel Mitchell - assistant engineer
Donnie Scantz - bass guitar, drum programming, keyboards ("2 of You")
Jahi Sundance - bass guitar, drum programming, keyboards ("2 of You")
Mario Winans - arranger ("Secret Place", "Picture This" and "Is Anybody Listening")
Wyldcard - keyboard, strings ("Sucka for Love"** and "2 of You")

Charts

Weekly charts

Year-end charts

Certifications

Release history

References

2008 albums
Albums produced by Bryan-Michael Cox
Albums produced by Danja (record producer)
Albums produced by Rockwilder
Albums produced by the Runners
Bad Boy Records albums
Danity Kane albums